NA-201 Sukkur-II is a constituency for the National Assembly of Pakistan.

Election 2002 

General elections were held on 10 Oct 2002.Abdul Mujeeb Pirzada  of PPP won by 51,694 votes.

Election 2008 

General elections were held on 18 Feb 2008. Syed Khursheed Ahmed Shah of PPP won by 93,394 votes.

Election 2013 

General elections were held on 11 May 2013. Syed Khursheed Ahmed Shah of PPP won by 85,120 votes and became the  member of National Assembly.

Election 2018 

General elections are scheduled to be held on 25 July 2018.

See also
NA-200 Sukkur-I
NA-202 Khairpur-I

References

External links 
Election result's official website

NA-199